Begonia malabarica, the Malabar begonia, is a species of flowering plant in the family Begoniaceae, native to India and Sri Lanka. It has antibacterial properties.

References

malabarica
Flora of India (region)
Flora of Sri Lanka
Plants described in 1785